The 2022 Himachal Football League was the 2nd season of the Himachal Football League, the top-tier league in the Indian state of Himachal Pradesh, organised by Himachal Pradesh Football Association (HPFA).

The 2022 season kicked off on 30 April with 9 teams competing for the title. Unlike the previous season, the league's duration has increased to one month. The format has also been changed to the league format wherein 9 teams are set to play each other twice.

Teams
The following 9 teams participated in the league.

Stadiums
 Khad Football Ground, Khad
 Nagnuli Ground, Nagnuli

Regular season

Matches

See also
 2021–22 Punjab State Super Football League
 2021–22 FD Senior Division

References

Football in Himachal Pradesh
2021–22 in Indian football leagues
2021–22 in Indian football